Dyabrino is a rural locality (a settlement) in Alexeyevskoye Rural Settlement of Krasnoborsky District, Arkhangelsk Oblast, Russia. The population was 374 as of 2010. There are 10 streets.

Geography 
Dyabrino is located on the Severnaya Dvina River, 7 km north of Krasnoborsk (the district's administrative centre) by road. Krasnoborsk is the nearest rural locality.

References 

Rural localities in Krasnoborsky District